Chonnam National University (CNU) is one of ten Flagship Korean National Universities located in Gwangju and South Jeolla Province, South Korea. In March 2006, Yeosu National University merged with Chonnam National University to become a satellite campus. CNU ranked the 10th nationwide and the 420th worldwide in world university rankings in the CWUR (Center for World University Rankings). It was also the 1st among the nine Korean national flagship universities in "Asia’s Top 75 Most Innovative Universities" in 2017 Reuters. CNU has also expanded its global reach by establishing partnerships with 499 Universities in 62 countries as of 2019.

CNU now offers courses in major areas of academic studies with 16 colleges and 11 graduate schools. It has two main campuses, one in Gwangju Metropolitan City and the other in the City of Yeosu. CNU also has two medical campuses and four university teaching hospitals. With more than 1,700 full-time professors, it now is a home to 35,000 students including 2,000 international students from 75 different countries. Each year, approximately 500 international exchange students come to study at CNU, while approximately 600 CNU students study abroad at various sister universities around the world.  Its complex of dormitories can house 4,000 students.

CNU is a research-oriented university, and the amount of its research funds exceeds more than US$150 million. It is particularly distinguished in the fields of agricultural studies, life sciences, computer science, biorobotics, engineering, and medical sciences.

History

Chonnam National University was established on January 1, 1952, from the merger of five universities in South Jeolla Province. A second merger with Yosu National University in 2006 created the separate Yosu Campus of CNU.

In 1980, members of the university's student body played a key role in instigating the Gwangju Uprising.

Academics

Colleges
College of Artificial Intelligence Convergence
College of Agriculture & Life Sciences
College of Arts
College of Business Administration
College of Education
College of Engineering
College of Human Ecology
College of Humanities
College of Law
College of Medicine
College of Natural Sciences
College of Nursing
College of Pharmacy
College of Social Sciences
College of Veterinary Medicine
College of Culture & Social Sciences (Yeosu Campus)
College of Engineering Sciences (Yeosu Campus)
College of Fisheries & Ocean Sciences (Yeosu Campus)
Division of Biological Sciences and Technology
Division of Self-designed Interdisciplinary Studies
Bachelor-master's degree program for School of Dentistry

Graduate programs
Graduate School
Graduate School of Business (Both English & Korean Track)
Graduate School of Culture
School of Dentistry
Law School
Medical School
Graduate School of Education
Graduate School of Industry and Technology
Graduate School of Public Administration
Graduate School of Educational & Industrial Cooperation (Yeosu Campus)
Graduate School of Fisheries & Ocean Sciences (Yeosu Campus)

Major facilities
Agro-Bioindustry Technical Support Center
Animal Resources Section
Forest Resources Section
Plant Resources Section
Animal Hospital
CNU Press and Broadcasting Center
Education Development Research Institute
Educational Training Institute
Center for Research Facilities
Health Service Center
Language Education Center
Library
School of Lifelong Education
Sports Center
Student Residence Hall
Gwangju Campus
Yeosu Campus
University Computing Center
University Museum

Major research centers
Environmental Research Institute
Honam Studies Research Center
Korea Dinosaur Research Center
Management Research Institute
May 18 Institute
Bio-IT Fusion Technology Research Center

Medical centers
Chonnam National University Hospital
Chonnam National University Hwasun Hospital
Chonnam National University Dental Hospital

Accreditation

IEQAS: International Educational Quality Assurance System in Korea (2013)
AACSB: Association to Advanced Collegiate School of Business (2012)
ABEEK: Accreditation Board for Engineering Education of Korea (2013)

Partner universities
The university maintains international ties with 136 universities in 26 countries: Australia, Austria, Bangladesh, Brazil, Cambodia, Canada, Chile, China, Czech Republic, Denmark, England, France, Germany, India, Indonesia, Japan, Kazakhstan, Philippines, Poland, Russia, Slovenia, Taiwan, Thailand, Turkey, United States, Uzbekistan, and Vietnam.

For international students
 Korean Language Free Courses
Two sessions of Korean classes are provided for all international students free of charge. The Language Education Center offers various levels of Korean language classes and programs for international students and foreign residents of Korea in general.
 Scholarships
 New Students: Scholarships are offered to incoming freshmen who are admitted as international students and automatically assessed when they apply to CNU.

Gallery

See also
Flagship Korean National Universities
List of national universities in South Korea
List of universities and colleges in South Korea
Education in Korea

References

External links

Official school website, in Korean
Official school website, in English
Agro-Bio-industry Technical Support Center
International Center
Language Education Center
Library
Museum
University Computing Center

Chonnam National University
National universities and colleges in South Korea
1952 establishments in South Korea
Educational institutions established in 1952